Brodek u Konice is a municipality and village in Prostějov District in the Olomouc Region of the Czech Republic. It has about 800 inhabitants.

Administrative parts
The village of Lhota u Konice is an administrative part of Brodek u Konice.

History
The first written mention of Brodek u Konice is from 1575. Lhota u Konice was first mentioned in 1379.

References

Villages in Prostějov District